Stornoway Airport  is an airfield located  east of the town of Stornoway on the Isle of Lewis, in Scotland. The airfield was opened in 1937, and was then used mainly for military purposes. The Royal Air Force had an air base (RAF Stornoway) there during the Second World War and also from 1972 until 1998, when it was a NATO forward operating base. During the Cold War, from 1960 to 1983, the airfield was the home of 112 Signals Unit Stornoway (RAF). NATO aircraft used the airport for missions over the North Atlantic and for stopovers en route to Greenland and the United States.

Stornoway Airport is owned by HIAL, a company controlled by the Scottish Government.

Nowadays the airfield is mainly used for domestic passenger services. The Royal Mail have a daily mail flight. Bristow Helicopters operate helicopters equipped for search and rescue, on behalf of His Majesty's Coastguard. There are privately owned light aircraft based at the airport.

Airlines and destinations

Passenger

Cargo

Statistics

Accident and incidents
 On 8 December 1983, a Cessna Citation I (G-UESS) crashed into the sea on approach to Stornoway Airport, killing all 10 passengers and crew.

References

External links

Stornoway Airport - Official website

1937 establishments in Scotland
Airports in Scotland
Highlands and Islands Airports
Transport in the Outer Hebrides
Airports established in 1937